The Knight Commission on Intercollegiate Athletics, often referred to simply as the Knight Commission, is a panel of American academic, athletic and sports leaders, with an eye toward reform of college athletics, particularly in regard to emphasizing academic values and policies that ensure athletic programs operate within the educational missions of their universities.

The commission was founded by the John S. and James L. Knight Foundation, which was itself founded by brothers John S. Knight and James L. Knight, members of the founding family of what became the Knight Ridder newspaper and broadcasting chain. The commission first met in 1989 after a series of scandals in college sports. The founding co-chairmen of the commission were Reverend Theodore M. Hesburgh, president of the University of Notre Dame, and William C. Friday, former president of the University of North Carolina system.

Currently, the commission serves as a leadership group which seeks to reform college sports, primarily by promoting policies that prioritize athletes’ education, health, safety and success. As an independent commission, it has no official connection to governing bodies such as the National Collegiate Athletic Association, the primary sanctioning body for college sports in the United States, or any government agencies. But because of its blue ribbon panel and high profile within the news media, the commission's work carries considerable influence within college sports as a whole. Since its inception, the NCAA has adopted a number of Commission recommendations, particularly those that strengthened academic standards.

First report: Keeping Faith with the Student Athlete
The commission issued its groundbreaking report, Keeping Faith with the Student Athlete: A New Model for Intercollegiate Athletics in 1991. In the report, the Knight Commission proposed a major overhaul in the way colleges run their athletic departments, proposing what it called the “one-plus-three” model — in which the “one,” control by the college president, is directed toward the “three” goals of academic integrity, financial integrity and independent certification. The report was influential in the implementation of many reforms by the NCAA, including a major restructuring within the NCAA itself, when in 1996 the governance of the association was taken away from college athletic directors and put into the hands of college presidents.

Second report: A Call to Action
In 2001, the commission issued its second major report, largely detailing what had transpired in the ten years since Keeping Faith was issued.A Call to Action: Reconnecting College Sports and Higher Education reiterated almost all of the original report's recommendations, while taking note that roughly two-thirds of the reforms recommended in Keeping Faith had been implemented to one degree or another.

One notable recommendation in A Call to Action was that the NCAA restrict participation in postseason to teams whose graduation rate is 50 percent or greater, a concept that influenced the development of NCAA academic policies and, ultimately, its 2011 adoption of an academic threshold for postseason competition.

Third report: Restoring the Balance
The Knight Commission’s third report Restoring the Balance: Dollars, Values, and the Future of College Sports was released in 2010. It calls for strengthening accountability through transparency, rewarding practices that make academics a priority, and treating athletes as students first. 

The Commission reemphasized a central recommendation in its 2001 report that teams be required to be on track to graduate at last half of their players to be eligible for postseason competition.  The NCAA voted to adopt this proposal in October 2011 using a metric the NCAA created in 2004 to project graduation rates based on eligibility and retention (the Academic Progress Rate).

The report also recommended that a portion of the NCAA financial incentives reward academic outcomes. The NCAA adopted changes to its revenue distribution formula in 2016 to reward academic outcomes.

Financial data in the report revealed that athletics spending and subsidies provided by most FBS institutions to their athletics budgets are rising more quickly than educational budgets. This, together with opinions from a 2009 “Presidential Survey on the Cost and Financing of Intercollegiate Athletics”, underscored the Commission's urgency to address the escalating costs of college sports through collaborative measures, which require support from presidents, NCAA leadership, university boards of trustees and conferences across the country.

Fourth major study and series of reports: Transforming the NCAA D-I Model Series

NIL:
In April 2020, a year and a half before the NCAA changed its rules allowing college athletes to receive compensation for the use of their name, image and likeness (NIL), the Commission recommended five principles to guide the development of such policies. A few weeks later, the NCAA’s proposed new NIL rules aligned with several of the Commission’s proposed principles; however, the NCAA never fully adopted its initial proposal. The Commission’s principles also influenced the Uniform Law Commission’s NIL Act

Recommendations for Change to Governance and Structure:
In December 2020, after a year-long examination, the Knight Commission called for major governance changes for Division I sports, proposing a new governing entity for the sport of football at the Football Bowl Subdivision (FBS) level, separate from the NCAA. The NCAA would govern all other sports in a reorganized Division I governance, and schools with FBS football programs would remain part of the NCAA in all other sports except football. The Commission outlined its recommendations in the report,Transforming the NCAA D-I Model: Recommendations for Change, and held four public forums, all virtually due to COVID-19.

"Transforming the NCAA D-I Model" was an examination of the overall NCAA Division I model, focusing especially on the impact of NCAA FBS football on D-I sports as a whole. The Commission recommended that the NCAA eliminate the current rules exemption that includes FBS football in its formula for revenue distributions from the NCAA Division I men's basketball tournament, even though FBS football does not meet the NCAA's normal criterion for inclusion in this formula—an NCAA-operated national championship.

The Commission presented its recommendations to NCAA president Mark Emmert shortly before releasing them publicly. The following recommendations were made:

FBS football should be governed by a new entity completely outside of NCAA control. The proposed body, which the Commission called the "National College Football Association" (NCFA) for convenience, would be responsible for all aspects of FBS football currently governed by the NCAA.
The NCFA would be funded primarily by College Football Playoff revenues.
D-I membership in all sports except FBS football would remain unchanged.
With the creation of the NCFA, D-I governance would be reorganized around men's basketball, the only sport sponsored by all D-I members.
In addition, the current D-I governance system, with voting rights weighted in favor of the FBS conferences, would be replaced by equal weighting for all D-I conferences.

Connecting Athletics Revenues with the Educational Model of College Sports (C.A.R.E. Model):
In September 2021, the Commission released a major proposal to more closely connect the distribution and spending of shared athletics revenues with the broad educational mission of college athletics programs. The C.A.R.E. Model would alter the distribution criteria and uses of funds for more than $3.5 billion distributed annually by the NCAA, CFP, and Division I conferences. The report recommends altering both the distribution criteria and uses of funds for more than $3.5 billion distributed annually by the NCAA, CFP, and Division I conferences. This C.A.R.E. Model is the newest set of recommendations in the Knight Commission’s “Transforming the D-I Model” series.

The Commission’s proposed requirements could be imposed either by Congress or the respective college sports governing bodies. The C.A.R.E. Model would require that five core principles guide both the distribution criteria and accountability for how shared athletics revenues are spent. Those core principles are:
Transparency;
Independent oversight;
Gender equity;
Broad-based sports opportunities; and
Financial responsibility.

Fifth report: Achieving Racial Equity in College Sports
In May 2021, the Commission released its Achieving Racial Equity in College Sports Report. The report highlights opportunities and steps to move toward fulfilling the goal of equitable treatment, and places special emphasis on moving from pledge to policy and advocacy to action. The Commission called on the NCAA and its member institutions to act to transform college sports by taking decisive action in four areas:
 
Closing educational opportunity gaps to create an equitable pathway for Black athletes’ success during and after college.
Holding institutions accountable in recruitment and hiring to achieve diversity and equity in athletics leadership.
Investing in programs that support and enhance Black athletes’ college experience and promote inclusion and belonging.
Creating more equitable opportunities for Black athletes to assume leadership roles, especially in advocacy and governance.
One of the recommendations calls on the NCAA to eliminate the use of standardized test scores for initial athletics eligibility requirements in NCAA Divisions I and II. On Oct. 15, 2021, the NCAA’s Task Force on the Use of Standardized Test Scores advanced this recommendation within the NCAA legislative process.

As part of the Commission’s ongoing commitment to advance the equity goals highlighted in this report, in February 2022, the Knight Commission announced four research projects selected to share $100,000 in research funding to demonstrate how specific interventions impact the Black athlete experience and/or Black athlete advocacy areas.

Additional Areas of Impact
College Sports Finances:
The Commission led several initiatives to provide greater financial transparency for college sports:

In 2013, the Commission launched the first-of-its-kind financial database tracking academic and athletics finances for Division I institutions, the College Athletics Financial Information (CAFI) Database. The database provides detailed financial information on athletics revenues at over 220 public NCAA Division I colleges and universities, dating back to 2005. The database has been used in many national sports stories examining money in college sports. In March 2022, the Commission partnered with the S.I. Newhouse School of Public Communications at Syracuse University to manage the database, rebranded as the Knight-Newhouse College Athletics Database.

In 2017, the Knight Commission’s efforts to provide greater financial transparency in college sports also led to the NCAA changing its annual financial report at the Commission’s request in order to require separate reporting for bonuses paid to college football coaches for postseason appearances and wins. Prior NCAA changes to the report had masked the full bonus compensation paid to FBS football coaches by including bonuses with all postseason expenses.

Governance and Independent Directors:

In 2013, the Knight Commission called on the NCAA to expand its governing board to include athletes and independent directors.

In 2018, the Knight Commission reiterated its call for independent directors along with other proposed several reforms to The Commission on College Basketball, led by former Secretary of State Condoleezza Rice – which was formed in response to the 2017 college basketball scandal. The Rice Commission advanced the Commission’s recommendation to add independent directors to the NCAA’s governing board. The following year, the NCAA implemented this recommendation, adding five independent members to the NCAA Board of Governors, the organization’s highest-ranking governing body. 

Responding to the NCAA as it overhauls its Constitution and Division I:

In 2021, the Commission delivered several communications to the NCAA’s leadership, governing boards and appointed NCAA Constitution Committee as the NCAA began its major work to overhaul its Constitution

On August 31, 2021, the Knight Commission co-chairs sent a letter to Robert M. Gates, chair, NCAA Constitution Committee, in response to that committee’s open call for input on major structural and constitutional issues that will reshape the mission and role of the NCAA. The letter highlights that for nearly two years, the Knight Commission has been engaged in a similar, sweeping examination of Division I’s governance, revenue distribution programs, NIL rules, and gender and racial equity performance. The letter summarizes the major findings and recommendations from the Commission’s examination.

In October, 2021 the Knight Commission co-chairs sent a letter to President Jere Morehead, Chair, NCAA Division I Board of Directors, calling for independent representation on the committee to be appointed to oversee rewriting Division I rules following expected changes to the NCAA Constitution in January 2022. 

On December 9, 2021 the Knight Commission co-chairs sent a letter to Robert Gates, chair, NCAA Constitution Committee, to offer reactions to the updated draft NCAA Constitution. The letter suggests incorporating several important modifications regarding governance and Board composition, and clarity on the Association’s legal liability and services.

College Football Playoff:

Separate from its overarching recommendations that impact all of college sports, the Knight Commission has made specific recommendations for reform to the college presidents, FBS commissioners, and FBS athletic directors who sit on the two executive boards that manage the College Football Playoff (CFP), which is independent of the NCAA.

In 2012, three years prior to the first College Football Playoff (CFP) in 2015, the Commission recommended that the revenue distribution for any new FBS football championship include academic incentives in its formula. The CFP incorporated this general recommendation in its revenue distribution formula.
Since 2017, the Commission has made additional significant recommendations for altering the governance and distribution of the CFP’s $500 million in annual revenues. The CFP’s managing boards have not adopted those recommendations to date, which include:
Adding college athletes and independent directors to its governing body; 
Earmarking revenues for athletes’ health and safety; 
Directing a portion of revenues to support initiatives to boost diversity in football coaching leadership; 
Requiring CFP revenues to cover the national costs for the sport of FBS football, such as catastrophic insurance and concussion research, which are currently covered by the NCAA’s March Madness revenues.

Current commission members and staff
As of 2021, the commission's co-chairs are Arne Duncan, former U.S. Secretary of Education; Len Elmore, attorney, former ESPN analyst and former standout basketball player for the University of Maryland, the NBA and the ABA; and Nancy Zimpher, Chancellor Emeritus, State University of New York. The commission's CEO is Amy Privette Perko, who is a member of the Wake Forest University Sports Hall of Fame and previously worked in college sports at the University of Kansas and at the NCAA.

Members (alphabetical by last name):
 Jonathan Alger, President, James Madison University
 Eric Barron, President Emeritus, Pennsylvania State University
 Pamela Bernard, Vice President and General Counsel, Duke University
 Dr. Christine Copper, Faculty Athletics Representative and Professor, United States Naval Academy
 Dr. Wayne Frederick, President, Howard University
 Walter Harrison, President Emeritus, University of Hartford
 Christopher Howard, President, Robert Morris University; former football player, U.S. Air Force Academy
 Derek Kerr, Executive Vice President and Chief Financial Officer, American Airlines
 Shanteona Keys, Former Women’s Basketball Player, Georgia College
 Penelope Ward Kyle, President Emeritus, Radford University
 Jonathan Mariner, Former Executive Vice President and Chief Financial Officer of Major League Baseball
Jacques McClendon, Director of Player Engagement, Los Angeles Rams and former football player, University of Tennessee and NFL player
Jessica Mendoza, Television Analyst, ESPN; former Olympic medalist and softball All-American
 Gloria Nevarez, Commissioner West Coast Conference
G. P. "Bud" Peterson, President, Georgia Institute of Technology
Jill Pilgrim, Managing Attorney, Pilgrim & Associates Arbitration, Law & Mediation LLC
Peter Roby, Advisor to the Director of Athletics, Dartmouth College, Former Director of Athletics and Recreation, Northeastern University
Kendall Spencer, Georgetown University Law Graduate, Former NCAA Board Member, Former Track & Field Athlete, University of New Mexico

Member, Ex-Officio
 Alberto Ibargüen, President and CEO, John S. and James L. Knight Foundation

Past co-chairs:
 Thomas K. Hearn Jr. – Chair, February 2005 – May 2006
 Clifton R. Wharton Jr. – Co-Chair, May 2006 – April 2007
 R. Gerald Turner – Co-Chair, May 2006 – Dec. 31, 2015
 William E. “Brit” Kirwan – Co-Chair, April 2007 – Dec. 31, 2015; Chair, Jan. 1, 2016 – Dec. 31, 2016

Founding Co-Chairs
 Rev. Theodore M. Hesburgh, C.S.C., President Emeritus, The University of Notre Dame, Founding Co-Chair, 1989-2001
 William C. Friday, President Emeritus, University of North Carolina, Founding Co-Chair, 1989-2001

External links
 Knight Commission on Intercollegiate Athletics official web site
 John S. and James L. Knight Foundation
 Knight-Newhouse College Athletics Database

College sports organizations in the United States